Omar Bustani (born 19 June 1966) is a Mexican archer. He competed at the 1988 Summer Olympics and the 1992 Summer Olympics.

References

1966 births
Living people
Mexican male archers
Olympic archers of Mexico
Archers at the 1988 Summer Olympics
Archers at the 1992 Summer Olympics
Place of birth missing (living people)
20th-century Mexican people